Kunnal is a village in Belgaum district in Karnataka, India.  from Ramdurg,  from Bengaluru,  from Mumbai.

References

Villages in Belagavi district